Moccasin Creek may refer to:

Moccasin Creek (Uwharrie River tributary), a stream in Montgomery County, North Carolina
Moccasin Creek (South Dakota), a creek in South Dakota
Moccasin Creek (Wisconsin), a creek in Wisconsin
Moccasin Creek State Park, a state park in Georgia